Aergo Capital Limited was founded in 1999 as an aircraft leasing and trading company. In October 2014, Aergo Capital partnered with CarVal Investors and is now under the ownership of funds managed by Carval Investors. 

Since inception, Aergo has traded over 250 aircraft with over 50 airlines.

Headquartered in Dublin, the leasing company has representatives in London, Miami, Kenya, Singapore and Jakarta. 

Aergo has a fleet of over 30 aircraft, including Boeing 737s, Airbus A320s, Airbus A330s and ATR aircraft.

References

External links
 Official website

Aircraft leasing companies of the Republic of Ireland
Transport companies established in 1999
Irish companies established in 1999